Lovell Harrison Rousseau (August 4, 1818 – January 7, 1869) was a general in the Union Army during the American Civil War, as well as a lawyer and politician in Kentucky and Indiana.

Early life and career
Born near Stanford, Kentucky, on August 4, 1818, Rousseau attended the common schools as a child. His father, David Rousseau, brought his family across the Appalachians from Virginia, but he had a difficult time regaining economic equilibrium (despite extensive holdings in undeveloped land and slaves). Lovell's elder brother had already left home, so when their father died of cholera attempting to move the family to a new home in 1833, it fell to Lovell and his younger brothers to dig their father's roadside grave. At age fifteen, he had become his family's primary breadwinner. Soon afterwards, he was forced to sell his family's slaves in an effort to cover the family's debts.

Eager to earn a wage, he began working on a road-building crew, traveling around the Midwest. Determined to rise, he studied grammar, mathematics, and French, and returned to Kentucky where he read law in Louisville, Kentucky, for several months. In 1841, he passed the Indiana bar examination and began practicing law with his brother, Richard Hillaire Rousseau, as junior partners in a firm led by James I. Dozier, in Bloomfield, Indiana. Both brothers married Dozier's daughters. Richard married Mary E. Dozier in 1839, while Lovell married Maria A. Dozier in 1843. (Mary Dozier Rousseau died young, and Richard remarried.)

Lovell successfully ran for the Indiana House of Representatives as a Whig candidate in 1844, and in 1846 he was commissioned as a captain in the Mexican–American War and charged with raising a company of volunteers. He led them at the Battle of Buena Vista, where he helped rally the Indiana troops at a key point in the battle.

When he returned from the war, he gained a seat in the Indiana Senate and continued to run a successful law practice.

After relocating to Louisville, Kentucky, he served in the Kentucky Senate from 1860 to 1861.

Civil War
As the Civil War was becoming more and more likely, Rousseau decided in favor of maintaining state government in Kentucky and helped keep it from seceding from the Union. He resigned from his seat in the senate in June 1861 and applied for a commission to raise volunteers. Against the opposition of many prominent figures in Kentucky, he succeeded in raising two regiments composed entirely of Kentuckians at Camp Joe Holt, across the Ohio River from Louisville in Jeffersonville, Indiana. They were known as the Louisville Legion. With the help of a battalion of the Louisville Home Guard, the regiments saved Louisville from being captured by Confederate troops. He was appointed colonel of the 5th Kentucky Volunteer Regiment in September 1861 and was later promoted to brigadier general of Volunteers attached to the army of General Ormsby M. Mitchel.

Later, Rousseau was once again promoted to major general of Volunteers. He served valiantly at the Battles of Shiloh, Stones River, during the Battle of Hoover's Gap Tullahoma Campaign and movements around Chattanooga, Tennessee. Although from November 1863 until his resignation in November 1865, Rousseau had command of Nashville, Tennessee, he had also, on Sherman's orders, carried out a very successful raid on the Montgomery and West Point Railroad in July 1864.

House of Representatives and assault on Josiah B. Grinnell
Rousseau was elected an Unconditional Unionist to the United States House of Representatives in 1864, serving from 1865 to 1866. As a former military officer, he served on the Committee on Military Affairs. In June 1866, relations between Rousseau and Iowa congressman Josiah Bushnell Grinnell became tense. The two had a series of debates over a bill intended to give more power to the Freedman's Bureau. Rousseau opposed it having seen and heard about rebellious and illegal actions by agents working for the bureau, whereas Grinnell strongly supported the bill as a former active abolitionist and aide to runaway slaves. The debates eventually turned into mudslinging, Grinnell questioning Rousseau's military record and insulting his performance in battle as well as a few comments on the state of Kentucky.

On June 14, 1866, Rousseau approached Grinnell in the east portico of the capitol building after a session of congress. He told Grinnell that he had been waiting for an apology from him for the insults he made about him before the House. Grinnell pretended not to know what Rousseau was talking about, enraging Rousseau who struck him repeatedly with the iron handle of his rattan cane until it broke. He struck him chiefly in the face but a few blows hit Grinnell's hand and shoulder. Grinnell walked away with only bruises and did not have to absent himself from congress. However, a committee was organized to investigate the incident which was composed of Nathaniel P. Banks, Henry J. Raymond, Rufus P. Spalding, M. Russell Thayer and John Hogan. Rousseau was reprimanded for his actions and soon later resigned. He was elected back the same year to fill the vacancy caused by himself and continued to serve until 1867.

Personal life 
Rousseau's daughter, Mary E. Rousseau, married Louis Douglas Watkins, USV, in Jefferson County, Kentucky, on August 4, 1864.

Later life and death
After leaving the House of Representatives, Rousseau was appointed brigadier general in the U.S. Army with the brevet rank of major general, and was assigned to duty in Alaska on March 27, 1867. General Rousseau played a key role in the transfer of Alaska from the Russian Empire to the United States on October 18, 1867, today celebrated as Alaska Day. On July 28, 1868, he was placed in command of the Department of Louisiana. He died in this capacity in New Orleans, Louisiana, on January 7, 1869. He was interred in Cave Hill National Cemetery in Louisville, Kentucky; in 1892, his wife had his body removed from Cave Hill and re-interred at Arlington National Cemetery in Arlington, Virginia. His monument at Cave Hill remains.

See also

 List of American Civil War generals (Union)
 Louisville in the American Civil War
 List of federal political scandals in the United States
 List of United States representatives expelled, censured, or reprimanded

Notes

References
 Retrieved on 2008-08-16
 Sons of the South: Battle of Leesburg (Ball's Bluff)
 Lovell Rousseau at Arlington National Cemetery
 Iowa Journal of History by the State Historical Society of Iowa
 Black, Col. Robert W. Cavalry Raids of the Civil War. Mechanicsburg, PA: Stackpole Books, 2004. .

External links

 
 
 Portrait of Gen. Rousseau on his horse

|-

1818 births
1869 deaths
19th-century American lawyers
19th-century American politicians
American lawyers admitted to the practice of law by reading law
American military personnel of the Mexican–American War
Burials at Arlington National Cemetery
Censured or reprimanded members of the United States House of Representatives
Indiana lawyers
Indiana state senators
Indiana Whigs
Kentucky lawyers
Kentucky state senators
Kentucky Unionists
Louisville, Kentucky, in the American Civil War
Members of the Indiana House of Representatives
Members of the United States House of Representatives from Kentucky
People from Bloomfield, Indiana
People from Indiana in the Mexican–American War
People from Lincoln County, Kentucky
People of Kentucky in the American Civil War
Politicians from Louisville, Kentucky
Unconditional Union Party members of the United States House of Representatives from Kentucky
Union Army generals